Wilman Modesta (born 24 December 1995) is a Dominican footballer who plays as a midfielder for Atlético Pantoja and the Dominican Republic national team.

International career
Modesta made his formal debut for Dominican Republic on 5 October 2016, starting in a 0–4 loss win against Trinidad and Tobago. He had played a friendly match two months before against Puerto Rico, but it was not recognised by FIFA.

International goals
Scores and results list Dominican Republic's goal tally first

References

1995 births
Living people
Sportspeople from Santo Domingo
Dominican Republic footballers
Association football midfielders
Liga Dominicana de Fútbol players
Club Barcelona Atlético players
Dominican Republic international footballers